The Black Stump Music and Arts Festival (called 'Black Stump,' 'Black Stump Festival' or just 'Stump' for short) was a four-day Christian festival that was held in the Greater Sydney Metropolitan region over the Labour Day long weekend, often the first weekend in October, from 1985 to 2014.

Features
Although the format of the festival changed slightly from year to year, there were some constant features including:

Main Stage (called Big Top 1995-2006, 2011-) - the primary venue used for Saturday morning, Sunday night and Monday Morning Bible Studies, Worship & Music. During the nights it is the venue used for headline and international acts.

Fools Theatre (formerly Off Broadway)  - interaction and comedy venue.

Sacred Space - Alternative worship. 
 
The Village - food and service venues and addition performance space.

The Supper Club - small stage for music with cafe style tables and food.

Metro - primary Rock venue

History
Black Stump was held annually since 1985 with the exception of four years: 1987, 1995, 2000 and 2010.

For most of its existence Black Stump has been held at Cataract Scout Park, Appin NSW, Australia and before that at Cattai.

Early history
The first festival was held to coincide with International Youth Year and was inspired by Pebblebrook in New Zealand and the Greenbelt Festival in the UK. It was organised by individuals from Baptist, Church of Christ, Uniting and Anglican churches as well as other youth orientated Christian organizations.

The first and second festivals were held in 1985 and 1986 at Cattai (at the former Paradise Gardens site).

From 1988 it was then held at Cataract Scout Park until 2007.

Gap years
The festival was not held in 1987 in order to plan to make it a regular festival, and to plan the relocation to Cataract Scout Park.

The intended 1995 festival was cancelled due to a significant financial shortfall resulting from the 1994 festival.

The festival was not held in 2000 because the Sydney Olympics ended on the October Long weekend.

The festival was not held in 2010 due to projected ticket sales being too low to meet increasing operating costs at the venue.

Equestrian Centre years
In 2008, Black Stump moved to the Sydney International Equestrian Centre in Horsley Park, due to ageing facilities at Cataract Scout Camp. From 2011 Black Stump returned to a rejuvenated Cataract Scout Park.

Beyond Festival
After the final Black Stump in 2014, some of its organizers went on to launch Beyond Festival. Considered the successor to Black Stump, but with an emphasis on promoting social justice from a Christian standpoint, Beyond Festival has been held at Greenhills Centre in Canberra on the Labour Day long weekend (first weekend in October) in 2015 and 2016. It was not held in 2017, with the next festival to take place at Kangaroo Valley, New South Wales on 23–25 November 2018.

Notable performers
Many artists have appeared at Black Stump and then gone onto wide popularity in the Christian or secular world. These include the Newsboys, Priority Paid, Rebecca St James, David Butts (Hooley Dooleys), Tim Harding (Hi-5), Sarah Blasko, Butterfly Boucher and Paul Colman. Tommy Emmanuel, In The Silence, Steve Taylor. Whiteheart, Quick and the Dead (Danger UXB),

External links
 Beyond Festival
 The Black Stump Festival (legacy Facebook page maintained by Beyond Festival)
 All Mankind at Blackstump

References

Music festivals in Australia
Christian music festivals
Religious festivals in Australia